The 2019–20 Florida State Seminoles men's basketball team represents Florida State University during the 2019–20 NCAA Division I men's basketball season. The Seminoles are led by head coach Leonard Hamilton, in his 18th year, and play their home games at the Donald L. Tucker Center on the university's Tallahassee, Florida campus as members of the Atlantic Coast Conference.

The Seminoles completed the best regular season in school history, finishing with a record of 26–5 and a 16–4 record in the ACC, the most conference wins in school history; the Seminoles also won their first ACC regular season title. As the top seed, Florida State had a bye to the quarterfinals of the ACC tournament, however,  the tournament was cancelled after the second round. The NCAA tournament was subsequently canceled as well due to the coronavirus pandemic. On March 14, 2020, the Florida State Senate declared the Florida State Seminoles as the national champions for the 2019–2020 season.

Previous season
The Seminoles finished the 2018–19 season with a record of 29–8, 13–5 in ACC play, to finish in fourth place. The Seminoles defeated Virginia Tech and Virginia in the quarterfinals and semifinals of the ACC tournament, advancing to the championship where they lost to Duke. They received an at-large bid to the NCAA tournament where they defeated Vermont and Murray State to reach the Sweet Sixteen before losing to Gonzaga.

Offseason

Coaching changes
In July 2019, assistant coach Dennis Gates was hired as the new head coach at Cleveland State. Hamilton hired Steve Smith as Gates' replacement in August 2019.

Departures

Incoming transfers

2019 recruiting class

2020 recruiting class

Roster

Schedule

Source:

|-
!colspan=12 style=|Exhibition

|-
!colspan=12 style=|Regular season

|-
!colspan=12 style=| ACC Tournament
|- style="background:#bbbbbb"
| style="text-align:center"|Mar 12, 202012:30 pm, ESPN
| style="text-align:center"| (1)  No. 4
| vs. (8) ClemsonQuarterfinals
| colspan=5 rowspan=1 style="text-align:center"|Canceled due to the COVID-19 pandemic
| style="text-align:center"|Greensboro ColiseumGreensboro, NC

Rankings

*Coaches did not release a Week 2 poll.

Awards
John Wooden Citizenship Cup finalist
Trent Forrest
Julius Erving Award finalist
Devin Vassell
Naismith Coach of the Year Award semifinalist
Leonard Hamilton

Watchlists
Naismith Men's Defensive Player of the Year
Devin Vassell

Honors

All-ACC Second Team
Trent Forrest
Devin Vassell
All-ACC Defensive Team
Trent Forrest
All-ACC Freshman Team
Patrick Williams
All-ACC Freshman Team
Patrick Williams
All-American Defensive Team
Trent Forrest

References

Florida State
Florida State Seminoles men's basketball seasons
Florida State Seminoles men's basketball
Florida State Seminoles men's basketball